Thomas Washington is an American journalist, columnist and essayist.

Biography
Washington was born in Chicago, Illinois. He is currently married and lives in Virginia, where he works as a journalist, essayist, and head librarian at the Potomac School, McLean, Virginia. He was a 2008 Yaddo fellow.

Selected works

References

External links

Thomas Washington's website

American columnists
American essayists
Living people
Writers from Chicago
Year of birth missing (living people)